John Feeney may refer to:
John Feeney (filmmaker) (1922–2006), New Zealand director of documentary films
John Feeney (newspaper proprietor) (1839–1905), newspaper proprietor and  philanthropist of Birmingham
John Frederick Feeney (1807–1869), newspaper proprietor and father of above
John Feeney (tenor) (1903–1967), Irish tenor
John Feeney (boxer), (born 1958), British boxer, national bantamweight champion 1981–1983, 1983–1985